The United States Post Office in Petaluma, California is located at 120 West Fourth Street.  The building, completed in 1933, has been listed on the National Register of Historic Places since 1985.

The building is in the Spanish Colonial Revival style with some Gothic touches.  Its front side (facing Fourth Street) presents five rounded arches surmounted by a terracotta frieze.  The front portion of the roof is covered with interlocking clay tiles.

Its NRHP nomination states: "The Petaluma Post Office derives its significance from its relation to the federal building programs of the 1920s and 1930s as they developed in California. It is an example of a style transitional between the classicism of the twenties and the Starved Classical style of the thirties."

See also 

National Register of Historic Places listings in Sonoma County, California
List of United States post offices

References

External links 

Current hours of operation

Buildings and structures in Sonoma County, California
Petaluma, California
Petaluma
Buildings and structures completed in 1933
National Register of Historic Places in Sonoma County, California
1933 establishments in California